Léonce Alloy, born in Paris in 1875, died 1949, was a French medallic sculptor and engraver.

He was a student of Barrias, Chaplain, Vernon and Couteau. He was a member of the Société des artistes français and exhibited from 1902 to 1942.

Notes 

1875 births
1949 deaths
20th-century French engravers
20th-century French male artists
Engravers from Paris
20th-century French sculptors
French male sculptors
20th-century French printmakers